, is a Japanese manga series written by Yuu Kuraishi and illustrated by Keishi Nishikida. It was serialised in Kodansha's shōnen manga magazine Weekly Shōnen Magazine from September 2011 to September 2014, with its chapters collected in 13 tankōbon volumes. It was released weekly on Crunchyroll Manga in English, with digital releases in volumes on Amazon Kindle and ComiXology.

Plot
Hitoshi Aoshima is an unpopular high schooler with average grades. He longs to have a girlfriend, especially the beautiful and smart Ai Wagatsuma. One day, he discovers he has time slipped 10 years in the future, where he is married to Ai. However, the time spent in the future is short-lived as he returns to regular time. Hitoshi is able to use some of his future knowledge to gain insights into what Ai likes, but soon discovers that some of his present actions can affect his future, including scenarios where he is not married to Ai. He also hangs out with a group of unpopular and quirky classmates called the DX Corps, and makes other friends including a female foreign exchange student and a fairly popular boy that the DX Corps disliked.

Characters

A second-year high school student who dreams of having a girlfriend. He has the ability to time slip ten years into the future, where he is married to Ai Wagatsuma, although he cannot control when he slips or returns. He is unpopular and gets average grades, and is a member of Zaishou High's volleyball team where he and his friends are benchwarmers. He ends up associating with the DX Corps, a secret society in his high school whose members are jealous of popular male students. His DX Corps codename is Laputa: Castle in the Sky.

The title character is the most attractive girl in school. She is known for her beauty, high grades and distinction in athletics. She is happily married to Hitoshi in the latter's time-slipped future. She is fond of animals and aspires to be a veterinarian. She is a star member of the swim club but injures her leg at a major swim competition.
 
Hitoshi's little sister who is in fifth grade in elementary school. She turns into a good-looking and fashionable gyaru in the future.
 
The DX Corps are a secret society of unpopular high school boys. They despise "life-havers who glorify romance". In addition to Hitoshi, there are the following members:
  – Hitoshi's friend with a flat top hairstyle. He is the leader of the DX Corps. In the future, he goes bald. His DX Corps codename is Unbreakable.
  – Hitoshi's portly friend with glasses and a mushroom bowl cut. His family is rich, and lives in a mansion. He adores Japanese idol groups such as AKB48. Hitoshi saves him from becoming a sex offender in the future. His DX corps codename is Holey Underwear.
In one of the future scenarios, he becomes a Monk when Hitoshi marries Itsuko Kaji, who Kyuuji fell in love with.
  – codenamed  He likes little girls. His nickname comes from his uncle, an indie wrestler who fights as 'Matrix Zaishou'. His family owns a liquor store.
  – codenamed  He likes hacking into phones, but is still the 'most normal' of the DX Corps and occasionally questions their more idiotic moments.
  A foreign exchange student from the Netherlands who becomes friends with Hitoshi and Ai. She is half-Japanese and half-Dutch, and is fairly buxom. In some of the future scenarios she becomes Hitoshi's wife; in others, she is a close friend of Hitoshi and Ai, alongside the DX Corps members. Her brother,  does not approve of Silvia staying in Japan. He is modelled on Kenshiro from Fist of the North Star; their three elder brothers are likewise modelled on Kenshiro's.
  A schoolmate who is popular with the girls, which led to the formation of the DX Corps. In one of the future scenarios, his life is ruined, so Hitoshi changes it for the better so that Dobashi becomes friends with Hitoshi and even becomes friendly with the DX Corps.
 
The Hagakure are a trio of nerdy girls who enjoy boys love comics. They get upset that the DX Corps have become popular despite being nerdy, and end up in a contest with them. They include the following:
  She is proud of her F-cup breasts. Although there is chemistry between Tanaka and Komatsu, it is dispelled when Dobashi passes by – the comparison of the two boys puts Komatsu completely out of the running.
  A "history nerd" who likes Masamune Date, to the point of becoming physically violent if she considers someone to be mocking him, as Itou does with his impersonation.
  – A shy girl who hardly ever talks. She aspires to become a manga artist, and is quite good looking. She develops a crush on Hitoshi, and later becomes his wife in a potential scenario. Her manga is even made into an anime.
  A substitute teacher whose everyday clumsiness and actions tend to be erotic. She is the love interest of Kyuuji and becomes the wife of Hitoshi in one potential scenario.
  A new math teacher at Hitoshi's school. He becomes the advisor of the volleyball team. He is later revealed to be a time slipper who has watched over Hitoshi's activities.

Release
Written by Yuu Kuraishi and illustrated by Keishi Nishikida, the manga was serialised by the magazine Weekly Shōnen Magazine and published by Kodansha in Japan and has been licensed to stream in Crunchyroll Manga for its international audience. 111 chapters were published with the final chapter on September 24, 2014. Kuraishi said that it was impossible for him to be a manga creator and work at a restrauant chain at the same time. 13 volumes have been published by Kodansha.

My Wife is Wagatsuma-san was listed among the first 12 Kodansha titles that were launched for Crunchyroll Manga.

Volume list
With a few exceptions, the chapter titles in the Japanese editions were printed in English. The first eleven chapters are numbered with a hash mark as in "#1", "#2", etc. They are numbered with a "N" in this list. The chapters after that are numbered as parts as in "PART1", "PART2", etc. They are numbered plainly on this list. The English version as published on Amazon Kindle/ComiXology also uses these translations.

Reception
Jason Thompson, in his review on Anime News Network, gave the manga  out of 4 stars. He described the manga series as "a pleasant surprise by getting funnier and funnier" and that "it's a cute premise handled in clever and silly ways." Deb Aoki wrote in Publishers Weekly that the series sounds similar to How I Met Your Mother.

See also
 Fort of Apocalypse – another manga series written by Kuraishi
 Starving Anonymous – another manga series written by Kuraishi

Notes

Works cited
  "Ch." is shortened form for chapter and refers to a chapter number of the My Wife is Wagatsuma-san manga. "Ch. N(number)" refers to the first set of chapters before it was reformatted.

References

External links
  at Shonen Magazine 
  at Kodansha Comics 
  at Kodansha USA
 

Crunchyroll manga
Kodansha manga
Romantic comedy anime and manga
Shōnen manga